"Blurred Lines" is a song by Robin Thicke.

Blurred Lines may also refer to:
 Blurred Lines (album), an album by Robin Thicke
 Blurred Lines Tour, the debut headlining tour by Robin Thicke
 "Blurred Lines" (Supergirl), an episode of Supergirl